Daniel John Taylor  (born November 1969) is a Canadian countertenor and early music specialist. Taylor runs the Theatre of Early Music and teaches at the University of Toronto.

Life and career
Daniel Taylor completed his undergraduate studies in English, philosophy and music at the Faculty of Music of McGill University (Montreal) and his graduate work in religion and music at the Université de Montréal. He continued overseas at the Royal Academy of Music and Royal College of Music in London with leaders of the baroque movement including the countertenor Michael Chance.

Taylor's Glyndebourne debut in the 1997 Peter Sellars's production of Handel's Theodora was followed by his operatic debut in Handel's Rodelinda. His other operatic roles have included Nerone in Monteverdi's L'incoronazione di Poppea, Hamor in Handel's "Jephtha", Oberon in Britten's "A Midsummer Night's Dream" and Tolomeo in Handel's Giulio Cesare. Taylor's repertory includes sacred works, lute songs, and contemporary works.

Taylor has performed with: Metropolitan Opera, Glyndebourne, San Francisco, Rome, Welsh National Opera, Canadian Opera, Opera North and Munich, Gabrieli Consort, Monteverdi Choir/English Baroque Soloists, Amsterdam Baroque Orchestra & Choir, Les Arts Florissants, Academy of Ancient Music), and he regularly joins forces with the Akademie für Alte Musik Berlin, Philharmonia Baroque, the Bach Collegium Japan, Orchestra of the Age of Enlightenment, the Academy of Ancient Music, Fretwork and the King's Consort.

Taylor holds an exclusive contract with Sony Classical Masterworks. He has made more than 100 recordings on many labels including DG Archiv, Harmonia Mundi, Sony, EMI, Carus, Analekta, Teldec, Atma and the CBC. He is artistic director, founder and conductor of the Theatre of Early Music, a professional choir and period instrument ensemble based in Montreal, Quebec, Canada. Among the awards, he has won a Gramophone Award (Bach Cantata Pilgrimage – Gardiner), BBC Award, the ADISQ and he was named Opus Prizes Discovery of the year and Artist of the Year.

He was involved in the project Bach Cantata Pilgrimage with John Eliot Gardiner and the Monteverdi Choir to perform and record the complete sacred cantatas of Johann Sebastian Bach at historic places throughout Europe. He has worked with John Nelson/Ensemble Orchestral Paris for the CD/DVD of Bach Mass in B minor at Notre Dame in Paris and has also recorded the Bach "Mass in B minor" with the Kammerchor Stuttgart, and in the Dieterich Buxtehude – Opera Omnia of Ton Koopman and the Amsterdam Baroque Orchestra & Choir to record the complete works of Dieterich Buxtehude.

Taylor has recorded the solos in Handel's Messiah more often than any other countertenor in the world – these include a DVD/CD with Nagano/Montreal Symphony (for Universal), the DVD/CD with Tafelmusik Baroque Orchestra (CBC), with Thomas/American Bach Soloists (Koch) and with Bernius/Kammerchor Stuttgart (Carus). He has appeared in this work on the world tour with Gardiner/Monteverdi Choir, as well as with Rilling/New York Philharmonic, Christophers/Boston Handel&Haydn, McGegan/Toronto Symphony and Rilling/Israel Philharmonic.

In recent seasons he appeared in debuts with the Madrid Symphony, with the San Francisco Symphony, Cleveland Orchestra, St. Louis Orchestra, in recital at Wigmore Hall, at the Teatro Colón Buenos Aires and at New York's Carnegie Hall; in Avery Fisher Hall and in Beijing at the Forbidden City Concert Hall. His recordings also include projects with the actor Ralph Fiennes, with the Cirque du Soleil and with the actor Jeremy Irons.

Daniel Taylor taught at the University of Ottawa (where he continues to give masterclasses) and at McGill University before accepting the post as Head of Early Music and Professor of Voice at the University of Toronto. He is a visiting artist at the University of Victoria and is on the Guest Faculty at the Victoria Conservatory of Music. He has given master classes at the Guildhall, at universities across Canada and the United States as well as at the Royal Academy of Music and the Royal College of Music in London.

Taylor was made an officer of the Order of Canada in 2021.

References

External links
Daniel Taylor Biography
Theatre of Early Music
 ATMA
BIS Records
 

1969 births
Living people
20th-century Canadian male opera singers
Operatic countertenors
McGill University School of Music alumni
21st-century Canadian male opera singers